In molecular biology, aerolysin is a cytolytic pore-forming toxin exported by Aeromonas hydrophila, a Gram-negative bacterium associated with diarrhoeal diseases and deep wound infections. The mature toxin binds to eukaryotic cells and aggregates to form holes (approximately 3 nm in diameter) leading to the destruction of the membrane permeability barrier and osmotic lysis. The structure of proaerolysin has been determined to 2.8A resolution and shows the protoxin to adopt a novel fold. Images of an aerolysin oligomer derived from electron microscopy have helped to construct a model of the protein in its  heptameric conformation, and to outline a mechanism by which this assembly might insert into lipid bilayers to form ion channels.

References

Protein domains